Popopo is a South Korean children's television series broadcast on Munhwa Broadcasting Corporation (MBC). Broadcast for over 32 years, it is considered to be the longest-running children's programme in South Korea. The series was announced to have ended in 2013.

References

External links 
 Popopo - Official Website

1981 South Korean television series debuts
2013 South Korean television series endings
Preschool education television series
MBC TV original programming
South Korean children's television shows
Korean-language television shows
1980s South Korean television series
1990s South Korean television series
2000s South Korean television series
2010s South Korean television series
1990s preschool education television series
2000s preschool education television series
2010s preschool education television series